Cassiopeia or Cassiopea may refer to:

Greek mythology
 Cassiopeia (mother of Andromeda), queen of Aethiopia and mother of Andromeda
 Cassiopeia (wife of Phoenix), wife of Phoenix, king of Phoenicia
 Cassiopeia, wife of Epaphus, king of Egypt, the son of Zeus and Io; mother of Libya

Science
 Cassiopeia (constellation), a northern constellation representing the queen of Ethiopia
 Cassiopeia A, a supernova remnant in that constellation
 Cassiopea, the genus of the "upside-down" jellyfish

Arts and entertainment

Film
 Cassiopeia (1996 film), a Brazilian CGI film
 Cassiopeia (2022 film), a South Korean film

Music
 Cassiopeia (TVXQ), the fan club of South Korean boy band TVXQ
 "Cassiopeia", a song by Shabütie (now known as Coheed and Cambria) from their 1999 EP The Penelope EP
 "Cassiopeia", a song by Joanna Newsom from her 2004 album The Milk-Eyed Mender
 "Cassiopeia", a song by Dragonland from their 2006 album Astronomy
 "Cassiopeia", a song by Sunny Lax from his 2006 EP P.U.M.A./Cassiopeia
 "Cassiopeia", a song by Rain from his 2006 album Rain's World
 "Cassiopeia", a song by Sara Bareilles from her 2013 album The Blessed Unrest

Fictional characters
 Cassiopeia "Cassie" Sullivan, in The 5th Wave series written by Rick Yancey
 Cassiopeia, a magical tortoise in Michael Ende's fantasy book Momo
 Cassiopeia (Battlestar Galactica), from the television series Battlestar Galactica
 Cassiopea (Encantadia), the first Queen of Lireo in the Encantadia fantasy series of GMA Network
 Cassiopeia, the mother of Octavian in The Astonishing Life of Octavian Nothing
 Cassiopeia, the secret identity of Penny from Pokémon Scarlet and Violet

Other
 Casio Cassiopeia, a series of pocket PCs
 Cassiopeia (train), an overnight rail service in Japan
 USS Cassiopeia (AK-75), a cargo ship used by the United States Navy in World War II

See also
 Boast of Cassiopeia
 Casiopea, (est. 1976) a Japanese jazz fusion group
 Casiopea (album), the group's self-titled debut album from 1979
 Kassiopi, a village and resort on the affluent north east coast of Corfu